The 2013 Challenge Cup Final was the 112th cup-deciding game of the rugby league 2013 Challenge Cup Season. It was held at Wembley Stadium in London on 24 August 2013, kick off 15:00. The final was contested by Hull F.C. and Wigan Warriors. The game saw Wigan Warriors beat Hull F.C. by 16 points to nill.

Background
The 2013 Challenge Cup Final marks Wigan Warriors's fifth final of the Super League era and Hull F.C.'s third. In addition it is the third time the two sides had met in the competition, with Wigan Warriors winning in both previous meetings during the 1958–59 Challenge Cup Final and 1984–85 Challenge Cup Final. Wigan had previously won a record 18 challenge cup finals compared to Hull's four.

Route to the final

Hull F.C.
As a 2012 Super League team, Hull F.C. entered in at the fourth round. They drew eventual Championship 1 champions North Wales Crusaders thrashing them by 62 points to 6. The fifth round saw Hull face Super League side Wakefield Trinity, beating them comfortably 24 points to 6. The quarter finals saw them face  Catalans Dragons winning 24–13. The semi-finals saw Hull F.C. draw eventual Super League runners-up Warrington Wolves, winning by a tight margin of 16–12.

Wigan Warriors
As a 2012 Super League team, Leeds Rhinos also entered in at the fourth round. A fourth round thrashing of Leigh Centurions 60 points to 10 placed them in the fifth round where a comfortable victory over Super League side Hull KR, beating them 46 points to 14. Warriors faced Widnes Vikings in the quarter finals, thrashing them 48 points to 4 Wigan then faced London Broncos in the semi-finals, nilling them by 70 points.

Pre-match
The pre-match entertainment was headlined by British classical crossover band BLAKE, who also sang the Challenge Cup and FA Cup Final anthem - "Abide with Me". At the end of their set, BLAKE were joined on the field by British soprano Natalie Coyle to sing the national anthem - "God Save the Queen".

Match details

Post match
Wigan's win meant that their record Challenge Cup titles was extended to 19 wins in the competition since their first win in 1923–24.

References

Challenge Cup finals
Hull F.C. matches
Wigan Warriors matches
August 2013 sports events in the United Kingdom
2013 sports events in London